Ein HaYam  is a small neighborhood in Haifa, Israel between Kiryat Sprinzak and Kiryat Eliezer, mostly separated from the sea by railroad tracks.

The neighborhood, founded in 1937 by Arab families, was previously called Wadi al-Jimal. The neighborhood was called "Ein HaYam -- Wadi al-Jimal" until 2006, when the official name and entrance sign were changed to "Ein HaYam (Previously Wadi al-Jimal)." In August 2021, the Haifa Naming Commission recommended restoration of the old name and signage and received pushback from some officials. The city council has yet to vote on the proposal.

2,400 Jews and Arabs live in the neighborhood, which has been cited a model of Jewish-Arab coexistence. It is home to the Oceanographic and Limnological Research Institute of Israel (IOLR), Tel Shikmona and the Ein HaYam trail tour.

References 

Coordinates on Wikidata
Mixed Israeli communities
Neighborhoods of Haifa
1937 establishments in Mandatory Palestine
Populated places established in 1937